Edwin R. Taber (1863 – February 16, 1916) was an American football coach.  He was the first head football coach at Wabash College in Crawfordsville, Indiana, serving for one season, in 1884 season, and compiling a record of 1–0.

Taber was a student-coach of the team.  The one game he coached was played on October 25, 1884 against Butler University at the Indianapolis Baseball Park.  Wabash won the game 4–0 and completed the first intercollegiate football game in the history of the state of Indiana.

Head coaching record

References

1863 births
1916 deaths
Wabash Little Giants football coaches
Wabash College alumni
People from Cass County, Indiana